The Paralympic World Cup is an annual international multi-sport event for elite athletes with a disability, that has been hosted in Manchester, England, since 2005. It is organized by the British Paralympic Association (BPA) in coordination with the International Paralympic Committee (IPC).

History

Since 2010, athletes are divided into four teams: Great Britain, Europe, Americas and one team with the rest of the world. Athletes' individual performances also count towards a team score, and the winning team get the BT Paralympic World Cup trophy.

Prior to 2011, the event was broadcast by the BBC with international highlights available. Prior to 2011, the credit card company Visa was the title sponsor for the event.

In 2011, the event's title sponsor was BT (British Telecommumications plc).  For 2011, Channel 4 is the host broadcaster.

Collaborations

Ottobock 
Ottobock is a company that works in orthopedic technology. They work to make, fix, and regulate prosthetics, orthotics, wheelchairs, and exoskeletons. In 2012, the company became "The Official Technical Service Provider" of the games. They have provided help to Paralympic athletes since 1988 and technical service at this World Cup since 2007. In 2012, the company was chosen as the Official Technical Service provider of the tournament. They provided a team of orthotists, prosthetists, and technicians of these devices and aided in providing equipment repair and maintenance throughout the games.

Sports
Athletics (2005–present)
Wheelchair basketball (2005–present) - at the Manchester Regional Arena indoor track
Swimming (2005–present) - at the Manchester Aquatics Centre
Track cycling (2005–2009) - at the Manchester Velodrome
Football 7-a-side (2010)
Demonstration sports
2011 Sitting volleyball
2011 Boccia

Editions

See also
Paralympic Winter World Cup
Paralympic Games

References

External links
Official site

Parasports competitions
Recurring sporting events established in 2005
Parasports world championships
World Cup